Jaïr Karam is a French professional football player and manager. From 2013 to 2018 he coached the French Guiana national football team. Since July 2018 he has been coach of Stade Poitevin.

References

External links
Profile at Soccerway.com
Profile at Soccerpunter.com

Living people
French Guianan footballers
French Guiana international footballers
Association football goalkeepers
French Guianan football managers
French football managers
French Guiana national football team managers
Place of birth missing (living people)
2017 CONCACAF Gold Cup managers
1976 births